Deraz Kola Rural District is a rural district (dehestan) in Babol Kenar District, Babol County, Mazandaran Province, Iran. At the 2006 census, its population was 7,431, in 2,136 families. The rural district has 44 villages.

References 

Rural Districts of Mazandaran Province
Babol County